Mount Siguniang (Skubla) is the highest mountain of Qionglai Mountains in Western China. It is located in the bordering area of Rilong Town, Xiaojin County and Wenchuan County in Ngawa Tibetan and Qiang Autonomous Prefecture, Sichuan Province.

Mount Siguniang is renowned for its beauty. Mount Siguniang National Park was identified as a UNESCO Heritage Site as part of Sichuan Giant Panda Sanctuaries in 2006. The park comprises Mount Siguniang and the surrounding three valleys, namely Changping Valley, Haizi Valley and Shuangqiao Valley, covering an area of 2,000sq km.

Peaks

Mount Siguniang encompasses four peaks (with  meaning 'peak'): Daguniang Feng  (Big Peak or 1st peak), Erguniang Feng  (2nd peak), Sanguniang Feng  (3rd peak), and Yaomei Feng, also known as Sanzuoshan Feng  (3rd peak).

It is also the second highest mountain in Sichuan Province and the easternmost  or higher peak on Earth. The first ascent was in 1981 by a Japanese team via the east ridge. Very few people attempt to climb this and very few of those succeed. The first ascent of the southwest ridge was made in 2008 by Chad Kellogg and Dylan Johnson.

The other three lower peaks are regular mountaineering destinations through all seasons. Mount Siguniang DaFeng is normally considered as a pure trekking peak while ErFeng and SanFeng are more challenging, requiring basic climbing techniques.

References

External links

Mount Siguniang Trekking,Camping,Climbing

Mountains of Sichuan
Ngawa Tibetan and Qiang Autonomous Prefecture